Living Room Games was an American game company, active between 2000 and 2006, that produced role-playing games, game supplements and books, particularly for the Earthdawn series.

Description
Living Room Games were a group of Earthdawn fans, friends, and gamers who took the news of Earthdawn being canceled harder than most. They licensed the game from FASA Corp in 2000, and produced of a second edition of the game in 2001, culminating in a revised second edition release in 2005. Meanwhile, FASA also granted RedBrick a parallel license for Earthdawn, and RedBrick at first called their line "EarthDawn Classic" to differentiate it from Living Room Games' edition and to indicate that they were staying closer to the art styles and setting of the original FASA line than Living Room Games had.

Living Room Games also published Digital Burn, Tony Digerolamo's Complete Mafia for D20, and Capcom World Tournament. The Capcom World Tournament was canceled in 2006, and no further items were produced after that year. The company, now called "Living Room Games Online", uses its name to focus primarily on online slots and casinos.

Publications

Barsaive At War - 2001
Barsaive in Chaos - 2002
Dangerous Goods - unpublished
Earthdawn (2nd Edition) - 2001
Earthdawn (2nd Edition, Revised) - 2005
 Earthdawn Companion (2nd Edition) - 2001
Earthdawn Companion (2nd Edition, Revised) - 2006
Gamemaster's Screen w/Into the Breach (2nd Edition) - 2002
Makers of Legend #1 - The Way of War - 2003
Makers of Legend #2 - The Wanderer's Way - 2005
Makers of Legend #3 - Way of Will - unpublished
Path of Deception - 2000
Scourge Unending - 2003
 The Book of Dragons (Revised, Expanded) - 2004

References

External links
Homepage
Earthdawn + Living Room Games - a discussion about the company
Earthdawn - Living Room Games (2nd Edition) - product descriptions

Earthdawn
Role-playing game publishing companies